Philip Lawrence may also refer to:

 Philip Lawrence (headmaster) (1947–1999), Irish school headmaster, gang violence murder victim
 Philip Kissick Lawrence (died 1841), U.S. federal judge
 Philip Lawrence (songwriter) (born 1974), American songwriter and producer who is part of the production team The Smeezingtons
 Philip Lawrence (politician), Canadian politician

See also
Dick Lawrence (Phillip Richard Lawrence, 1915–1960), Australian politician